Ennio Cardoni (February 21, 1929 – July 14, 2012) was an Italian professional football player.

Cardoni was born in Livorno.  He played for 6 seasons (147 games, 1 goal) in the Serie A for Genoa C.F.C., A.S. Roma, Atalanta B.C. and Calcio Lecco 1912.

References

1929 births
2012 deaths
Italian footballers
Serie A players
A.C.N. Siena 1904 players
A.C. Ancona players
U.S. Livorno 1915 players
Genoa C.F.C. players
A.S. Roma players
Atalanta B.C. players
Calcio Lecco 1912 players
Association football defenders